Jack and the Beanstalk is a 1967 live-action/animated-hybrid musical-themed telefilm that was produced and directed by and starred Gene Kelly. It was produced by William Hanna and Joseph Barbera. It is a retelling of the popular fairy tale that mixes both live action and animation. The film premiered on NBC, on February 26, 1967.

The songs, written by Sammy Cahn and Jimmy Van Heusen, included "Half-Past April and a Quarter to May", "It's Been Nice", "What Does a Woggle Bird Do?" and "One Starry Moment".

The special won the 1967 Emmy Award for "Outstanding Children's Program".

Plot 
The adventure begins when Jack (Bobby Riha) trades his cow for some magic beans from peddler Jeremy Keen (Gene Kelly). The beans sprout a beanstalk high into the clouds, and Jack and Jeremy climb it to discover a giant (voiced by Ted Cassidy), a goose that lays golden eggs, and a princess named Princess Serena (voiced by Janet Waldo and sung by Marni Nixon) who is trapped in a harp by a magic spell and can only be released through a kiss.

Cast
Bobby Riha as Jack
Dick Beals as Jack (singing voice)
Gene Kelly	as Jeremy Keen, Proprietor
Ted Cassidy as The Giant
Marian McKnight as Jack's Mother/Serena
Janet Waldo as Princess Serena
Marni Nixon as Princess Serena (singing voice)
Chris Allen as Mouse
Leo DeLyon as Woggle-Bird #1
Cliff Norton as Woggle-Bird #2
Don Messick as Cat, Mice (uncredited)

References

External links

1967 films
1960s American animated films
1960s children's animated films
1960s fantasy films
1967 musical comedy films
American children's animated adventure films
American children's animated comedy films
American children's animated fantasy films
American films with live action and animation
American children's animated musical films
American fantasy adventure films
American musical comedy films
American television films
Films based on Jack and the Beanstalk
Films directed by Gene Kelly
Films scored by Lennie Hayton
Hanna-Barbera animated films
NBC television specials
1960s English-language films